Alishetty Prabhakar was a painter, photographer and progressive Telugu language writer. He died at the age of 39 due to prolonged illness.

Early life
He was born in Jagital  from Jagital district. He discontinued his studies at intermediate level.
Initially he started with photographing Festive vibes, Nature and also as a Paparazzi

Career
At first he started his career as an artist. He mainly painted pictures of festivals, nature, and actors. He then had met with "Sahithi Mitra Deepthi" through which he had entered into poetry. He established a studio in Jagithyala "Studio purnima" then in Karimnagar "Studio Shilpi" and also in Hyderabad "Studio Chitralekha". After he joined 'sahithi mitramaa deepthi' he started to write poems. He was also a painter. He wrote articles and poems in the Andhra Jyothi newspaper such as "City Life", and published over 420 items.

His first poem was "Parishkaram" which was published in Andhrasacharithra a weekly newspaper in 1974. He established photo studios and wrote poems. His famous writing were 'Era Pavuralu' (his first writing) in 1978, "Mantala Jendalu", "Churakalu" in 1979, "Raktharekha" in 1985, "Enekala Endamavi" in 1989, "Sankshobha Ghetam" in 1990, "City Life" in 1992. In "City Life" he described Hyderabad in Telangana.

Bibliography
 Yerra Pavuralu
 Mantala Jendalu
 Churakalu
 Raktarekha
 City Life in Andhra Jyothy newspaper
 Maranam naa chivari charanam kaadu
 Sankshobhageetam

References

 Telangana State Government, 10th class Telugu textbook. Lesson 5 "Nagargeetham".

Telugu people
Telugu poets
People from Karimnagar district
Indian male poets
Osmania University alumni
1954 births
1993 deaths